

Mount Jimmy Simpson is a  summit located  northwest of Bow Lake in Banff National Park, in the Canadian Rockies of Alberta, Canada. Its nearest higher peak is Mount Thompson,  to the southwest. Mount Jimmy Simpson is a member of the Waputik Mountains, and is situated east of the Wapta Icefield and west of the Bow River valley. Mount Jimmy Simpson can be seen from the Icefields Parkway at Bow Lake. Jimmy Simpson Junior is a 2,721 meter sub-summit east of the mountain.

History

Mount Jimmy Simpson is named for Jimmy Simpson (1877–1972) who was a respected outfitter in the early explorations of the Canadian Rockies. Jimmy worked as a cook for Tom Wilson and learned the guide and outfitting business from Bill Peyto. In 1902, while working for Peyto, he was given the responsibility of leading James Outram's climbing expedition into the headwaters of the North Saskatchewan River and Columbia Icefield. Jimmy built a small log cabin for use with his outfitting business on the north shore of Bow Lake. It was expanded in 1937, and is now the historic Num-Ti-Jah Lodge. Jimmy continued actively guiding until the end of World War II when his son, Jimmy Simpson Junior, took over the business.

The first ascent of Mount Jimmy Simpson was made in 1897 by J. Norman Collie, George Percival , and Peter Sarbach. The mountain's name was officially adopted in 1973 by the Geographical Names Board of Canada.

Geology

Like other mountains in Banff Park, Mount Jimmy Simpson is composed of sedimentary rock laid down during the Precambrian to Jurassic periods. Formed in shallow seas, this sedimentary rock was pushed east and over the top of younger rock during the Laramide orogeny.

Climate

Based on the Köppen climate classification, Mount Jimmy Simpson is located in a subarctic climate with cold, snowy winters, and mild summers.

Gallery

See also

List of mountains of Canada
Geology of Alberta

References

External links
 Weather forecast: Mount Jimmy Simpson
 Parks Canada web site: Banff National Park

Two-thousanders of Alberta
Mountains of Banff National Park
Canadian Rockies
Alberta's Rockies